

386001–386100 

|-bgcolor=#f2f2f2
| colspan=4 align=center | 
|}

386101–386200 

|-bgcolor=#f2f2f2
| colspan=4 align=center | 
|}

386201–386300 

|-bgcolor=#f2f2f2
| colspan=4 align=center | 
|}

386301–386400 

|-bgcolor=#f2f2f2
| colspan=4 align=center | 
|}

386401–386500 

|-bgcolor=#f2f2f2
| colspan=4 align=center | 
|}

386501–386600 

|-bgcolor=#f2f2f2
| colspan=4 align=center | 
|}

386601–386700 

|-id=622
| 386622 New Zealand ||  || New Zealand, a country comprising two main islands, and numerous smaller islands, situated in the Southwest Pacific Ocean. It is also known as Aotearoa (land of the long white cloud) by the indigenous Māori people. || 
|}

386701–386800 

|-bgcolor=#f2f2f2
| colspan=4 align=center | 
|}

386801–386900 

|-bgcolor=#f2f2f2
| colspan=4 align=center | 
|}

386901–387000 

|-bgcolor=#f2f2f2
| colspan=4 align=center | 
|}

References 

386001-387000